The men's decathlon event at the 1997 Summer Universiade was held at the Stadio Cibali in Catania, Italy, on 29 and 30 August.

Results

References

results

Athletics at the 1997 Summer Universiade
1997